Abdel Rahman Suwar al-Dahab (otherwise known as Suwar al-Dahab or al-Dahab; 1934 – 18 October 2018) was the President of Sudan from 6 April 1985, to 6 May 1986.

His full name has also been listed by the Sudanese Ministry of Defence as Abdul Rahman Muhammad Hassan Swar Al Thahab.

Biography
Swar-Eldahab was born in 1934 in Omdurman, Sudan. He graduated from the Sudanese Military Academy, later attending military education courses in Britain, the United States, Egypt, and Jordan. He became a prominent figure when then-President Gaafar Nimeiry appointed him Chief of Staff, and then Minister of Defence and general commander of the armed forces in 1984.

In 1985, he launched a coup ousting President Gaafar Nimeiry leading to him becoming the Chairman of the Transitional Military Council. Following elections, he surrendered power to the government of head of state Ahmed al-Mirghani and prime minister Sadiq al-Mahdi in 1986.

In 1987, he became Chairman of the Islamic Call Organization.

In 2004, he received the King Faisal International Prize for his service to Islam. He died on 18 October 2018 in Riyadh, Saudi Arabia of natural causes.

References

1934 births
2018 deaths
People from Omdurman
Presidents of Sudan
Government ministers of Sudan
Sudanese military personnel
Leaders who took power by coup
Field marshals
Recipients of orders, decorations, and medals of Sudan